Ever Since We Love is a 2015 Chinese film directed by Li Yu based on one of the stories in the 2001 Chinese novel Everything Grows by Feng Tang (the Chinese title is the same as the novel). The film was released on April 17, 2015.

Like Li Yu's past 3 films since 2007, Fan Bingbing is cast as the main lead.

Cast
Fan Bingbing - Liu Qing (柳 青 Liǔ Qīng)
Han Geng - Qiu Shui (秋 水 Qiū Shuǐ)
Qi Xi (齐 溪) - Bai Lu (白 露 Bái Lù)
Yang Di
Zhang Boyu
Zhao Yiwei
Shen Tingting
Wu Mochou - Wei Yan (魏 妍 Wèi Yán)
Sha Yi (沙 溢) - Mr. Bai (白老師 Bái-lǎoshī)
Lei Kesheng
Vivien Li
Lü Xing

Theme song
"Wan Wu Sheng Zhang" (万物生长; "Everything Grows") — same title as the film's Chinese name
Lyrics: Feng Tang - the author of the original novel
Music and singer: Song Dongye

Box office 
It opened in China on April 17, 2015, and earned US$11.59 million in its opening weekend, with 79,322 screenings and 2.13 million admissions, debuting at number two, behind Hollywood blockbuster film Furious 7.

References

External links

Trailer

Films based on Chinese novels
Films directed by Li Yu
2015 films
Heyi Pictures films
Chinese romantic drama films
2015 romantic drama films